Government Engineering College, Arwal (GEC Arwal) is a technical institute established in 2019 by the Government of Bihar under the Department of Science and Technology, Bihar. It is approved by AICTE and is affiliated with Aryabhatta Knowledge University.

Departments 
GEC Arwal offers undergraduate courses in three streams of engineering:
the institute offers full-time Bachelor of Technology (B.Tech.) degree programs in disciplines of science and technology: College offers B.Tech. in three branches:
 Civil Engineering(Number of seats - 60)
 Mechanical Engineering(Number of seats - 60)
 Electrical Engineering(Number of seats - 120).

Admission 
Till 2018: The Bihar Combined Entrance Competitive Examination Board(BCECEB) conducts an exam based on the Merit List of the Bihar Combined Entrance Competitive Examination  successful candidates appear in the counseling at the allotted college during online counseling procedure

From 2019 onwards admissions in state engineering colleges of Bihar will be based on JEE mains marks. Students have to fill the application form on the BCECE Board website for admission.

References 

Colleges in India
2019 establishments in Bihar
Engineering colleges in Bihar
Colleges affiliated to Aryabhatta Knowledge University
Educational institutions established in 2019